Expecting may refer to:

 "Expecting" (Angel), a 2000 episode of the TV series Angel
 "Expecting", a song from the album White Blood Cells by The White Stripes
 A pregnant female
 Expecting (film), a 2013 American comedy film